Actinidia arguta, the hardy kiwi, is a perennial vine native to Japan, Korea, Northern China, and the Russian Far East.  It produces a small kiwifruit without the hair-like fiber covering the outside, unlike most other species of the genus.

Description 

The fruit is referred to as Siberian gooseberry, Siberian kiwi, hardy kiwifruit, kiwi berry, arctic kiwi, baby kiwi, dessert kiwi, grape kiwi, northern kiwi, or cocktail kiwi, and is an edible, berry- or grape-sized fruit similar to kiwifruit in taste and appearance, but is green, brownish, or purple with smooth skin, sometimes with a red blush. Often sweeter than the kiwifruit, hardy kiwifruit can be eaten whole and do not need to be peeled. Thin-walled, its exterior is smooth and leathery.

Botanical history and taxonomy 
Actinidia arguta was first described by Philipp Franz von Siebold and Joseph Gerhard Zuccarini in 1843 as Trochostigma argutum. It was then moved to the genus Actinidia in 1867 by Friedrich Anton Wilhelm Miquel after the invalidly published suggestion by Jules Émile Planchon to move the species.

Varieties
The species consists of three varieties:
Actinidia arguta var. arguta (autonym)
Actinidia arguta var. giraldii (Diels) Vorosch.
Actinidia arguta var. hypoleuca (Nakai) Kitam.

Actinidia arguta var. giraldii was originally described by Ludwig Diels at the species rank (Actinidia giraldii) in 1905, but was later reduced to a variety of A. arguta in 1972 by Vladimir Nikolaevich Voroschilov. A. arguta var. hypoleuca was originally described at the species rank (Actinidia hypoleuca) by Takenoshin Nakai in 1904, but reduced to a variety of A. arguta in 1980 by Siro Kitamura.

Actinidia arguta had been placed in section Leiocarpae and series Lamellatae, but this current infrageneric classification is unsupported. A 2002 study of the nuclear DNA internal transcribed spacer sequence and the plastid matK gene sequence for cladistic analysis revealed the current circumscription of the sections to be polyphyletic, with A. arguta forming a clade with A. melanandra near the base of the phylogenetic tree.

Cultivars
The most popular cultivars include 'Ananasnaya', 'Geneva', 'MSU', 'Weiki', 'Jumbo Verde', and 'Rogow'. A commonly sold self-fertile hybrid is the Japanese cultivar 'Issai' (A. arguta × rufa).

Cultivation 

The fast-growing, climbing, twining vine (bine) is very hardy (hence the name hardy kiwi), and is capable of surviving slow temperature drops to -34 °C (-30 °F), although young shoots can be vulnerable to frost in the spring. The vines need a frost-free growing season of about 150 days, but are not damaged by late freezes, provided that temperature changes are sufficiently gradual to allow plants to acclimate. Indeed, a period of winter chill is necessary for successful cultivation. However, rapid freezes kill off buds and split vines.  The vines can also be grown in low-chill areas.

While hardy kiwi may be grown directly from seeds (germination time is about one month), propagating from cuttings is also possible. Growing from seeds needs a period of cold stratification of one to two months to germinate. Hardy kiwi cuttings may be grafted directly onto established kiwifruit rootstock, or rooted themselves.

In domestic cultivation, a trellis may be used to encourage horizontal growth for easy maintenance and harvesting; however, vines grow extremely quickly and require a strong trellis for support. Each vine can grow up to 20 ft in a single season, given ideal growing conditions. For commercial planting, placement is important: plants can tolerate partial shade, but yields are optimized with full sunlight. Hardy kiwi vines consume large volumes of water; therefore, they are usually grown in well-drained, acidic soils to prevent root rot.

Pollination and harvest 
For vines to bear fruit, both male and female plants must be present to enable pollination. A male pollinator can enable six female producers to fruit. Flowering typically occurs in late spring (May in the Northern Hemisphere) starting in the third year of growth. If flowers become frost-burned, however, no fruit production will occur during the remainder of the year.

An autumn harvest is standard among all varieties; within this, actual harvest times are highly dependent on local climate and the specific cultivar grown. Each individual vine can produce up to 100 pounds of fruit per year, but average annual yield is roughly 50 lb per vine. Both fruit size and total yield are highly cultivar-dependent.  Fruit left to ripen on the vine has an 18 to 25% sugar content at time of harvest.

Pests
Hardy kiwi vines are vulnerable to several botanical diseases, including phytophthora crown and root rot (the most serious problem), botrytis rot, and sclerotinia blight. Vines are also vulnerable to pest infestations, including root knot nematodes, two-spotted spider mites, leaf rollers, thrips, and Japanese beetles.  Cats can also pose a problem, as they are attracted to a catnip-like smell produced by the hardy kiwi vines. Cats have been known to destroy vines and dig up roots in search of the source of the scent.

Commercial production
Attempts to commercialize the fruit have been historically unsuccessful due to its short shelf-life and sporadic tendencies to ripen. However, attempts are being made to bring the fruit to greater bear, and commercial production initiatives are underway on a small scale in South America, New Zealand, Europe, Canada, and the United States (in Oregon, Washington, and central Pennsylvania).

Culinary use 

Hardy kiwi can be used in jam.

Korea 
In Korea, hardy kiwi is known as darae. Young leaves, called darae-sun, are often consumed as namul vegetable.

Russia 

In the Russian Far East, it is known as kishmish (the same word has a different meaning in other parts of Russia). It is a very popular seasonal fruit, usually sold at farmer's markets.

Invasiveness in the United States 
Actinidia arguta has been cultivated by hobbyists, and more recently commercially, in the northeastern United States since at least the early 1900s with no significant impact on the region's forests noted, until recently.  Due to rampant overgrowth and "complete domination of mature trees" at sites in western Massachusetts and Coffin Woods, North Shore Wildlife Sanctuary in Long Island, New York, A. arguta vines of unknown genotype and provenance are now reported by groups including Mass Audubon to be invasive.  Whether such localized sites indicate an invasive risk for the region as a whole is controversial, given the long history of this widely distributed and cultivated species in the northeastern United States. Since successful invasions of non-native species can occur gradually over time, these reported sites warrant further investigation and suggest the need for more widespread monitoring.

Fossil record  
Macrofossils of A. arguta from the early Pliocene epoch have been found in western Georgia in the Caucasus region.

See also
 Actinidia deliciosa, the fuzzy kiwifruit

References

arguta
Flora of Northeast Asia
Flora of Siberia
Flora of Korea
Flora of China
Flora of Japan
Fruits originating in East Asia
Plants described in 1843
Garden plants of Asia
Vines
Taxa named by Friedrich Anton Wilhelm Miquel
Taxa named by Jules Émile Planchon